St John the Evangelist's Church is in the village of Gressingham, Lancashire, England. The church is recorded in the National Heritage List for England as a designated Grade I listed building. It is an active Anglican parish church in the deanery of Tunstall, the archdeaconry of Lancaster and the diocese of Blackburn. Its benefice is combined with those of St Margaret, Hornby, St John the Baptist, Arkholme, and St Michael the Archangel, Whittington-in-Lonsdale.

History

Parts of the church date from the 12th century. It was partly rebuilt in 1734 and restored in 1862 by E. G. Paley. The restoration included the removal of the porch, rebuilding the south wall with the addition of buttresses and windows, adding a new east window and new lights in the north clerestory, restoration of the chancel arch, reseating, removing the ceiling, and tiling the chancel; this amounted to a cost of about £300.

Architecture

Exterior

The church is built in sandstone rubble with a stone slate roof. The plan consists of a west tower, a nave with clerestory, a north aisle and a chancel with a small chapel to the north. The tower, which dates from 1734, is of three stages with pilaster strips and a solid parapet. In the lower stage is a west window. The south nave wall is of three bays, with a buttress between the nave and the chancel. The windows date from the restoration of 1862. At the left of the south aspect is a Norman doorway with jambs in three orders, the outer order having a chevron design and the middle one ropework. The north aisle has two bays to the chancel and three to the nave. A stone with Anglo-Saxon carving is built into the west wall of the nave at the south corner.

Interior

The nave arcade consists of three bays. The chapel to the north of the chancel contains a tomb chest to George Marton of Capernwray Hall who died in 1867. The pulpit has plain panels and is dated 1714; the pews are box pews. Two of the windows contain stained glass by Morris & Co. Inside the church are two more stones with Anglo-Saxon carving.

External features

The churchyard contains the war graves of a British soldier of World War I, and a British Army officer of World War II.

See also

Grade I listed churches in Lancashire
Listed buildings in Gressingham
List of ecclesiastical works by E. G. Paley

References

External links
GENUKI article

Church of England church buildings in Lancashire
Grade I listed churches in Lancashire
Gothic Revival architecture in Lancashire
English churches with Norman architecture
Churches completed in 1734
Churches completed in 1862
Diocese of Blackburn
E. G. Paley buildings
Churches in the City of Lancaster
1862 establishments in England